Song Hui-gyeong (1376–1446) was a scholar-official of the Joseon Dynasty Korea in the 15th century.

He was also diplomat and ambassador, representing Joseon interests in the Hoeryesa (diplomatic mission) to the Ashikaga shogunate in Japan.

1419-1420 mission to Japan
King Sejong dispatched a diplomatic mission to Japan in 1419–1420. This embassy to court of Ashikaga Yoshimasa in Kamakura was led by Song Hui-gyeong . Its purpose was to respond to a message sent to the Joseon court by the Japanese shogun.

The Japanese hosts may have construed this mission as tending to confirm a Japanocentric world order.  Song Hui-gyeong's actions were more narrowly focused in negotiating protocols for Joseon-Japan diplomatic relations.

See also
 Song Sun, grandson of Song Hui-gyeong.
 Joseon diplomacy
 Joseon missions to Japan
 Joseon tongsinsa

Notes

References

 Daehwan, Noh.  "The Eclectic Development of Neo-Confucianism and Statecraft from the 18th to the 19th Century," Korea Journal (Winter 2003).
 Kang, Etsuko Hae-jin . (1997). Diplomacy and Ideology in Japanese-Korean Relations: from the Fifteenth to the Eighteenth Century. Basingstoke, Hampshire; Macmillan. ; 
 Lewis, James Bryant. (2000). Frontier contact between chosŏn Korea and Tokugawa Japan. London: Routledge.

External links
 Joseon Tongsinsa Cultural Exchange Association ; 

1376 births
1446 deaths
15th-century Korean people
Korean diplomats